The 1980–81 Thorn EMI Rugby Union County Championship was the 81st edition of England's County Championship rugby union club competition.

Northumberland won their second title (but first since 1898) after defeating Gloucestershire in the final.

First Round

Second Round

Semi finals

Final

See also
 English rugby union system
 Rugby union in England

References

Rugby Union County Championship
County Championship (rugby union) seasons